The Café de Flore is one of the oldest coffeehouses in Paris, celebrated for its famous clientele, which in the past included high-profile writers and philosophers. It is located at the corner of Boulevard Saint-Germain and Rue Saint-Benoît, in Saint-Germain-des-Prés in the 6th arrondissement. The nearest underground station is Saint-Germain-des-Prés, served by line 4 of Paris Métro. The coffeehouse still remains a popular hang-out spot for celebrities and its status attracts numerous tourists.

History 

The café was opened in the 1880s, during the Third Republic. The name is taken from a sculpture of Flora, the goddess of flowers and the season of spring in Roman mythology, located on the opposite side of the boulevard. Authors Joris-Karl Huysmans and Remy de Gourmont were two of the first well-known regulars. In the late 19th century, Charles Maurras wrote his book Au signe de Flore on the café's first floor, where in 1899 the Revue d'Action Française was also founded.

The Café de Flore became a popular hub of famous writers and philosophers. Georges Bataille, Robert Desnos, Léon-Paul Fargue, Raymond Queneau were all regulars, as was Pablo Picasso. Chinese Premier Zhou Enlai was known to be a frequent patron of Café de Flore during his years in France in the 1920s. The classic Art Deco interior of all red seating, mahogany and mirrors has changed little since World War II.

Like its main rival, Les Deux Magots, it has been frequented by numerous French intellectuals during the post-war years. In his essay "A Tale of Two Cafes" and his book Paris to the Moon, American writer Adam Gopnik mused over the possible explanations of why the Flore had become, by the late 1990s, much more fashionable and popular than Les Deux Magots, despite the fact that the latter café was associated with Jean-Paul Sartre, Simone de Beauvoir, Albert Camus, and other famous thinkers of the 1940s and 1950s.

A Romanian thinkers league also frequented the place, notably Emil Cioran, Eugene Ionesco and essayist Benjamin Fondane.

The Prix de Flore, a literary prize inaugurated by Frédéric Beigbeder in 1994, is awarded annually at the Café de Flore.

In popular culture 
 Café de Flore appeared in the 1963 film The Fire Within.
 The café is mentioned in the 1975 song "Et mon père" by Nicolas Peyrac.
 Amanda Lear filmed her music video "Égal" in Café de Flore in 1981.
James Baldwin wrote much of his 1953 classic "Go Tell It On The Mountain" while drinking cognac and coffee on the cafe's second floor.
 The café was a setting and featured in the dust jacket of Ravelstein, written by Saul Bellow.
 The café was featured in the 3rd episode ("Paris") of series 4 of Absolutely Fabulous in 2001.
 The coffeehouse appeared in the lyrics of the 2002 song "L'Entarté" by Renaud.
 It's subject of Les Amants du Flore (2006), a film about Jean-Paul Sartre and Simone de Beauvoir.
 Parts of the 2011 film Love Lasts Three Years were filmed in Café de Flore.
 Season 1, episode 6 of Emily in Paris contains a scene filmed in Café de Flore.
 "Cafe de Flore", 2022 song by the Moldovan singer The Motans which appears on the album "Great Expectations"

See also 

 Café Procope
 Les Deux Magots
 Place Jean-Paul-Sartre-et-Simone-de-Beauvoir

References

External links 
 
 Official Facebook page

Buildings and structures in the 6th arrondissement of Paris
Coffeehouses and cafés in Paris
Restaurants in Paris